Paul Hamilton (born May 28, 1958) is an American football coach and former player. He is the interim head football coach at Kentucky State University. Hamilton served as the head football coach at East Tennessee State University from 1997 to 2003, at Elon University from 2004 to 2005, and at Brevard College from 2007 to 2016. He played college football as a quarterback at Appalachian State University from 1978 to 1980.

Head coaching record

References

External links
 Kentucky State profile

1958 births
Living people
American football quarterbacks
Air Force Falcons football coaches
Appalachian State Mountaineers football players
Brevard Tornados football coaches
The Citadel Bulldogs football coaches
Elon Phoenix football coaches
East Tennessee State Buccaneers football coaches
Georgia Tech Yellow Jackets football coaches
Kentucky State Thorobreds football coaches
Wofford Terriers football coaches